Aranmula may refer to:
 Aranmula, a town in Kerala, India
 Aranmula International Airport
 Aranmula Boat Race
 Aranmula Parthasarathy Temple, a Hindu temple in Kerala, India
 Aranmula Ponnamma, Indian actress
 Aranmula kannadi, an Indian handmade metal-alloy mirror
 Aranmula Kottaram, a Palace in Kerala, India

Aranmula